Statue of Tadeusz Kościuszko may refer to:

 Equestrian statue of Tadeusz Kościuszko (Milwaukee)
 Kosciuszko's Monument (West Point)
 Statue of Tadeusz Kościuszko (Boston)
 Statue of Tadeusz Kościuszko (Washington, D.C.)
 Tadeusz Kościuszko Monument (Chicago)
 Tadeusz Kościuszko Monument, Kraków
 Tadeusz Kościuszko Monument, Warsaw